The following is a list of the television networks and announcers who have broadcast college football's Texas Bowl throughout the years. In 2011 and 2012, the game was called the Meineke Car Care Bowl of Texas.

TV broadcasters

Radio broadcasters

References 

Texas Bowl
Broadcasters
Texas Bowl
Texas Bowl
Texas Bowl
Texas sports-related lists